Bordo may refer to

People
 Michael D. Bordo, professor of economic history at Rutgers University
 Susan Bordo, modern feminist philosopher
 Borivoj Dovnikovic-Bordo, Croatian animator who created the 1968 film Krek

Wine grapes
 Cabernet Franc, known as Bordo grape in Italy
 Chasselas, known as Bordo in various wine regions
 Ives noir, known as Bordô in Brazil

Other
 Bordo Bereliler - an elite armed force of officers in the Turkish Army
 Bordo Dates, an American dates company
 An Italian village belonging to the Comune of Borgomezzavalle Verbano-Cusio-Ossola
 The French place and wine Bordeaux is pronounced like Bordo

See also
 El Bordo (disambiguation)